The initialism OCL can have several meanings, depending on context:
OCl−, the hypochlorite ion, in chemistry
Open Content License
Object Constraint Language
IBM Open Class Library
Operational Control Language of IBM mid-range computers
Overseas Containers Limited, former shipping company
OFC Champions League, football tournament